Malou de Guzman (born August 24, 1958) is a Filipina stage, television and film actress.

Personal life
De Guzman has a daughter Luchi, with former actor Ross Rival. She is an alumnus of the University of the Philippines-Diliman where she occasionally taught theater arts for college students.

Filmography

Film

Television

Theater

Awards and nominations

References

External links

1958 births
Living people
Actresses from Manila
Filipino television actresses
ABS-CBN personalities
GMA Network personalities